Minghella is a surname. Notable people with the surname include:

 Anthony Minghella (1954–2008), English film director, playwright and screenwriter
 Dominic Minghella (born 1967), English television screenwriter, brother of Anthony
 Loretta Minghella (born 1962), British charity executive and solicitor, sister of Anthony 
 Max Minghella (born 1985), English actor, son of Anthony
 Maurizio Minghella (born 1958), Italian serial killer

Italian-language surnames